is a Japanese developer of video games. Most of their games were unreleased outside Japan and received no particular critical or commercial attention - notable exceptions to this are Cooking Mama for the Nintendo DS and iOS, and Cooking Mama: Cook Off for the Wii of the Cooking Mama series.

Notes

References

External links 
 Official website 

Cooking Mama
Video game companies of Japan
Video game development companies